Kaare Reitan (8 August 1903 – 8 October 2000) was a Norwegian orthodontist who was instrumental in introducing through his histological research experiments the responses of tissues to orthodontic tooth movement. His experiments set a foundation for future research on the effects on surrounding tissues of teeth by the mechanical forces of orthodontics. He was a recipient of Albert H. Ketcham Award.

Life
He was born in Andebu, Norway. He then traveled to Paris to study linguistics and dentistry. He completed his dental degree in 1928 from a dental school there. He then started working in Sandefjord as a dentist. He then traveled to US and enrolled himself at the Northwestern University in Chicago in 1937. He completed his orthodontics and received his Masters there in 1939. He then started working under Dr. William Skillen and Balint Orban for the histological research. Later he returned to Norway in 1940 and practiced Orthodontics.

Orthodontics
In 1946, he investigated the morphology of tissue changes and presented his thesis in 1951 called "The initial tissue reaction incident to orthodontic tooth movement as related to the influence of function". He worked on dogs on his experiment. His research was key in distinguishing the tissue response difference between animals and humans. His research was important in introducing possibly detrimental effects of orthodontics on tooth movement. He then returned to US in 1950 and further worked with Dr. Gottlieb, Dr. Sicher and Dr. Weinmann. His research focused on histological reactions in teeth and surrounding tissues. He studied the factors that influenced orthodontic tooth movement.

He published over 50 papers and has contributed to many chapters of orthodontic textbooks.

Awards and recognition
 John Valentine Mershon Lecturer - 1966
 Prix George Villain - 1967
 Albert H. Ketcham Award - 1976
 Honorary member of Danish and Norwegian Orthodontic Societies - 1972
 Honorary Doctorate from University of Gothenburg and University of Bergen

References

1903 births
2000 deaths
Norwegian expatriates in France
Norwegian expatriates in the United States
Northwestern University Dental School alumni
Orthodontists
20th-century dentists